Mitra Hejazipour (born 19 February 1993) is an Iranian chess player who holds the title of Woman Grandmaster.

She won the silver medal in the World Under-10 Girls Championship in 2003.

Hejazipour won the Iranian Women Chess Championship in 2012. She was the runner-up in 2013 and in 2014.

She competed in the Women's World Chess Championship 2015, in which she was knocked out by Pia Cramling in the first round.

Hejazipour won the 2015 Asian Continental Women's Championship in Al Ain. Thanks to this achievement, she earned the title of Woman Grandmaster and qualified for the next knockout Women's World Championship.

She has been playing for the Iranian team at the Women's Chess Olympiads since 2008. Mitra Hejazipour was fired from the Iranian national team in 2020 for "removing her headscarf (hijab) during the World Rapid & Blitz Chess Championship in Moscow". Hejazipour said that the hijab is a "limitation, not protection, as official regime propaganda claims."

List of Career Achievements

References

External links 

1993 births
Living people
Chess woman grandmasters
Iranian female chess players
People from Mashhad
Chess players at the 2010 Asian Games
Asian Games competitors for Iran